Road Builder (M) Holdings Bhd. is a holding company based in Kuala Lumpur, Malaysia. As of 2007, Road Builder Holdings is 100% owned by IJM Corporation Berhad.

Subsidiaries
Besraya (M) Sdn Bhd (60%)
Essmarine Terminal Sdn Bhd (100%)
Gagah Garuda Sdn Bhd (100%)
HMS Resource Sdn Bhd (100%)
Kuantan Port Consortium Sdn Bhd (30%)
New Pantai Expressway Sdn Bhd (100%)
NPE Property Development Sdn Bhd (100%)
West Coast Expressway Sdn Bhd (20%)

References

External links 
 Road Builder (M) Holdings Bhd, ijm.com
 Company Overview of Road Builder (M) Holdings Bhd., bloomberg.com

Holding companies of Malaysia
Privately held companies of Malaysia
Malaysian companies established in 1992
Holding companies established in 1992